Jet Airliner Crash Data Evaluation Centre (JACDEC) is a company providing commercial aviation safety analysis. 

The company promotes the ‘JACDEC Safety Index’, a rating system developed from the company’s proprietary database. The JACDEC Centre also monitors current safety occurrences and provides updates on airline safety issues on several social networks. 

The ratings take into account the number and deadliness of the hull losses (destroyed airplanes) they have suffered in the past 30 years, how they have fared more recently, and how many flights they have flown without incident. These results do not take into account the cause of the hull losses or whether the airline is at fault, so they are not a perfect measure of how safely an airline operates.

The JACDEC Airline Safety Ranking

Since 2002 JACDEC has published an annual ranking of the "Safest 60 Airlines". The index rating, JACDEC distinguishes whether an event is a total loss or a serious incident: Both will be recorded in the JACDEC Database, but in the final weighting a total loss counts considerably more. The term "total loss" means that any repair costs of accident damage exceeds the residual value of the aircraft or the aircraft was totally destroyed. JACDEC include only flights where paying passengers were on board. Therefore, all freight– ferry, training or maintenance flights– are disregarded.

JACDEC considers the operational environment as one important factor for an airline´s safety performance.

JACDEC concludes "There is a direct correlation between the safety of an airline and the competence and transparency of the controlling authorities."
Therefore, the results of the so-called USOAP (Universal Safety Oversight Audit Programme). 
In particular it is investigated how a country is able to meet and maintain defined standards of aviation safety. USOAP Website
The results of this investigation are published and can be viewed by everyone.

Furthermore, JACDEC takes into account what level of transparency a governing authority has.

Controversies
JACDEC's methodology has been criticized within the airline evaluation industry as unreliable and not transparent.

The inaccuracy of the company's indexing has been debated after a list was issued for the German Newspaper Bild's web site after the crash of Air France Flight 447, displaying the safety index of world's 60 biggest airlines. The list which was possibly wrongly computed unfairly included Turkish Airlines as the list's 60th, and least safe airline, which is indeed a Star Alliance member. The starting year for the list was precisely chosen as 1973, some 36 years back. Including Turkish Airlines Flight 981 that had crashed in 1974 and at a time when most of the airlines that were listed did not even exist, such as JetBlue Airways which was founded in 1999 and other regional companies with less flight frequency.

References

External links
JACDEC - current JACDEC Safety Indices

Aviation statistics
Aviation safety